The Disabled Persons Transport Advisory Committee (also known as "DPTAC") is an expert committee established by the Transport Act 1985, to provide advice to the government on the transport needs of disabled people.

Membership of the DPTAC is mostly, but not exclusively, disabled people.

Work

The Committee has advised the Government on several measures, including requesting additional finance for works to rail access and work on accessibility for users of taxi services

During the coronavirus pandemic, the DPTAC issued guidance regarding the use of face coverings, specifically on the identification of exemptions to the requirements.

Abolition

The Committee was considered for abolition with a successor organisation taking over its work. A consultation was held in 2012 with responses from organisations such as the Office of Road and Rail; however the result was not published by the Committee.

The abolition of the organisation was confirmed to happen in March 2022 by the Equality and Human Rights Commission; however this decision was criticised by disability campaigners.

References

External Links
 Disabled Persons Transport Advisory Committee (dft.gov.uk)
 Keith Richards

Department for Transport
Public transport in the United Kingdom